The Waluwara were an indigenous Australian people of the state of Queensland.

Language
The ethnonym of the people comes from the name for their language, Warluwarra, which is classified as one of the Ngarna languages.

Country
They were on the Georgina River, northwards from Roxborough Downs to Carandotta and Urandangi. Their territory took in Moonah Creek and the area in the vicinity of Rochedale. Their southwestern frontier was around Pituri Creek.

Social organization
The Waluwara were composed of several hordes of which the following are known:-
 Didjadidja. (Roxborough)
 Kapula. (Carandotta)
 Panggara. (Moonah Creek)

Foreign impressions
J. G. Edge, reporting on some words in their language, thought the Waluwara 'poor specimens of the dark race', citing as an illustration of their backwardness a lack of knowledge of the sea. He was also under the impression that native lore attributed the rites of subincision in their Miki ceremony of initiation as originating in a lack of water sufficient to provide enough food to sustain their numerous children, so that a ceremony of emasculation was established.

Alternative names
 Walugara
 Walukara
 Elookera
 Wollegarra
 Waloo-kera
 Warluwara
 Wallawarra
 Wolga. (toponym)
 Walgra
 Didjadidja
 Kapula
 Panggara/Pangara
 Paringgara ('creek dwellers')
 Yannalinka.(? horde name at Carandotta)
 Maula

Notes

Citations

Sources

Aboriginal peoples of Queensland